Atlantic City Weekly (ACW) is a free newspaper in Atlantic City, New Jersey. Atlantic City Weekly is the source for what's happening in South Jersey. Published every Thursday, it covers entertainment, casinos, dining, real estate, sports, movies, nightlife, gambling, news, and photos of the local Atlantic City.

History
Originally started by Lewis B. Steiner with the help of his parents, Herb and Marcia Steiner under the name Whoot!, Lew Steiner started the paper when he was a Junior at Stockton College in Pomona, New Jersey, in 1974. Herb Steiner became the Feature Editor and after he died in 1989, Marcia Steiner became the Editor and Food Reviewer until she died in 1998. After Lew Steiner married Christine Steiner in 1981, she became the office manager. The newspaper covered the Atlantic City nightlife prior to the popularized casino scene of the present.  As the city went under a period of economic growth, Steiner began shooting videos of local entertainment in the Casinos as well as interviews with celebrities and locals. The videos have been an integral part of the Web site, www.acweekly.com/multimedia. Steiner also has over 400 videos on YouTube.com/LewSteiner.

In 2000, Review Publishing LP of Philadelphia purchased the paper making it a sister publication to the Philadelphia Weekly. From there it adopted a similar format as well as changing its name to Atlantic City Weekly. Lew Steiner remained the Founder, Sales Manager & Publisher. Editors included Jeff Schwachter, Editor; Lori Hoffman, Ray Schweibert, Associate Editors; and Craig Billow, Art Director. Atlantic City  Weekly can be found in Atlantic County and Cape May County.

In 2015, Review Publishing sold its newspapers; the Weekly was acquired by BH Media, parent of The Press of Atlantic City.

Weekly columns

Ask the Geator
Jerry Blavat, a DJ known as "“The Geator” with the heater, the boss with the hot sauce,” answers music and trivia questions.

Jeff Schwachter, an award-winning editor and columnist, offers observations in stories and contributions on the AC Weekly blog.

Curtain Call
Veteran reporter David Spatz, in "Curtain Call", presents celebrity interviews, show reviews and breaking casino entertainment news.

Movies, Sports, Entertainment
Associate editor and award-winning film critic Lori Hoffman has been writing about movies, casino entertainment and sports in these pages for over thirty years as well as breaking news on the AC Weekly blog.

Nightlife
Associate editor Ray Schweibert is the nightlife columnist and also writes entertainment features and contributes to the AC Weekly blog.

References

External links

Atlantic City Weekly official blog
Philadelphia Weekly
Review Publishing

1974 establishments in New Jersey
Weekly newspapers published in the United States
Atlantic City, New Jersey
Lee Enterprises publications
Companies based in Atlantic County, New Jersey
Pleasantville, New Jersey
Newspapers published in New Jersey
Publications established in 1974